Kieran O'Rourke (born 1987) is an Irish hurler who played as a right corner-back for the Limerick senior team.

O'Rourke joined the team during the 2007 National League and was a semi-regular member of the starting fifteen over subsequent seasons. He enjoyed little success in the senior grade and was an unused substitute in Limerick's All-Ireland final defeat in 2007.

At club level O'Rourke is a one-time county club championship medalist with Bruree.

Playing career

Club

O'Rourke plays his club hurling with Bruree and has enjoyed much success.

In 2006 he lined out in his first hurling championship decider. Patrickswell were the opponents, however, a narrow 1-16 to 1-15 victory gave O'Rourke a Limerick Senior Hurling Championship medal.

Inter-county

O'Rourke made his senior debut for Limerick in a National League game against Antrim in 2007. He played a number of games during that campaign and was subsequently included on Limerick's championship panel.

After a number of seasons in which he failed to make an impact on the Limerick team, O'Rourke was recalled to the panel in 2010 as the majority of Limerick's regular players refused to play. He made his championship debut that year in a Munster semi-final defeat by Cork.

In 2011 O'Rourke was dropped from the Limerick panel as new manager John Allen took charge at the end of the year.

Honours

Team
Bruree
 Limerick Senior Club Hurling Championship (1): 2006

References

1987 births
Living people
Bruree hurlers
Limerick inter-county hurlers